Mahirul Qadri (Urdu ماہر القادری) whose real name was Manzoor Hussain was a writer, poet, and novelist. He was born in village Kesar Kalan Tahsil Pilibhit on 30 July 1906, in Bulandshahar district of Uttar Pradesh India. He studied at Aligarh Muslim University. In 1947 he migrated to Karachi Pakistan. He affixed his poetic pen-name Mahir with Qadri due to his spiritual links with the Qadiriyya order of Sufism.
This great poet and writer died while participating in a mushaira in Jeddah on 12 May 1978

Poetic career
At the age of 13, he began his poetic career. His first ghazal was published in Bulandshahr Gazette in 1924. Later Mahir-ul-Qadri went to Hyderabad, Deccan, where for 10 years he held key literary positions. He was associated with men like Kishen Pershad Kaul and Nawab Moazzam Jah

Books
Mahirul Qadari published more than twenty books. Some of his works are.
Durr e Yateem
Aatish-e-Khamosh, 
Shiraaza, 
Mehsoosat-e-Mahir, 
Naghmaat-e-Mahir, 
Jazbaat-e-Mahir, 
Karvan-e-Hijaz, 
Zakhm-o-Marham, 
Yaad-e-Raftagaan, 
Firdaus, 
Tilism-e-Hayaat.

See also
Muhammad Tahir-ul-Qadri

References

Urdu-language poets from Pakistan
Urdu-language writers from British India
Urdu-language religious writers
20th-century Urdu-language writers
Muhajir people
Muslim reformers
Pakistani Sunni Muslim scholars of Islam
Barelvis
Muslim writers
Pakistani religious writers
Qadiri order